Avava (Navava), also known as Katbol, Tembimbe-Katbol, or Bangsa’ is an Oceanic language of central Malekula, Vanuatu. It has nasalized fricatives and a bilabial trill.

The four Avava-speaking villages speak or spoke, distinct dialects. Timbembe and Nevaar (Nɨviar) are still spoken.  The Nivat (Nevat) and Bangasa (Umbrul) dialects are extinct.  Bangasa/Bangsa', or more correctly Bangasak, was known as Numbuwul by its neighbors to the north; the endonym is Umbbuul .

Phonology
When the final syllable is light (CV), stress tends to be penultimate. When the final syllable is heavy (CVC, CVV, CVː), stress tends to be final.

Vowels
There are a total of eight vowel quantities in Avava: five short vowels and three long vowels. About 2% of vowels are long. Long  is not attested, and long  is marginal. This is a pattern shared with Naman. At the end of a prosodic unit – in citation form, utterance-finally and when speaking slowly – word-final vowels other than  tend to be replaced with "diphthongs" . Word-initial vowels present in citation form tend to be lost when the word is linked to others, e.g. when the subject of a verb or possessed by a pronoun. This is the reason for the alternative form of the name of the language, vava.

{| class="wikitable" style="text-align:center"
!
! front
! back
|-
! high
| 
| 
|-
! mid
| 
| 
|-
! low
| colspan="2"| 
|}

The three long vowels in Avava are /i:/, /u:/, and /a:/. Though there is evidence for the long /o:/, the vowel is only shown in three words throughout the entire lexicon of Avava.

Consonants
{| class="wikitable" style="text-align:center"
|+ Avava consonant inventory
|-
! rowspan="2" colspan="2" |
! colspan="2" | Labial
! rowspan="2" | Coronal
! rowspan="2" | Dorsal
! rowspan="2" | Glottal
|-
! plain
! labialized
|-
!colspan="2"|Nasal
| 
| 
| 
| 
|
|-
!rowspan="2"| Plosive
! voiceless
| 
|
| 
| 
|
|-
! prenasalized
| 
| 
| 
| 
|
|-
!colspan="2"|Fricative
| 
| 
| 
| []
| 
|-
!colspan="2"|Trill
|colspan=2|
| 
|
|
|-
!colspan="2"|Tap
|
|
| 
|
|
|-
!colspan="2"|Approximant
|
| 
| 
| 
|
|}

 is post-alveolar. The voiceless stops are lightly aspirated. Otherwise, the consonants have the values their IPA transcriptions suggest.

 does not occur at the beginning of a word. Labialized consonants are only found before . Word-final  is lost when the word is suffixed or followed by a modifier.

It is generally rounded, and word-finally the trilled release is at least partially devoiced, . It may occur in word-final position after any vowel, but in CV position the following vowel is overwhelmingly , though other vowels do occur, e.g. 'coral'.

Consonant allophones
Prenasalization is maintained after oral consonants, e.g.  'earthquake', but is lost after a nasal, e.g.  'bamboo roof pins'. Prenasalized stops are occasionally devoiced word finally, e.g.  'mud'.

 occasionally has a trilled release when followed by :  'spit'.

Nasals and liquids are syllabified in word-final CN, CL clusters and in medial CNC, CLC clusters:  'we (paucal inclusive)',  'we (paucal exclusive)'.

 is  word-initially, word-finally, before another consonant, and between front vowels; it is also the more common allophone between front and non-front vowels.

 are generally  word-initially.

Nouns and Noun Phrases

Pronouns
The use of pronouns in Avava refer to what person the subject is in, the number of speakers, and the inclusivity, as shown in the table below

The paucal form of a word vs the plural form of the word is generally characterized by the number of subjects. The paucal pronouns include a small number, greater than two but less than ten. The paucal and plural forms also differ systemically as they differ in the suffixes -dur and -tl.

Nominalization
The Avava language utilizes the process of nominalization to create words from pre-existing ones. Verbal nominalization of words involve the addition of the suffix -ian. 

In some cases, the nominalized form of a reduplicated verb contains the unreduplicated root.

Another pattern of nominalization involves the addition of the suffix -ian as well as the addition of the first vowel of the word to the beginning of the word to create a noun from a verb.

Place of origin
The prefix, ma-, when added to the name of a place, refers to a person that is from that specified area.

Possession
Nouns in Avava can be divided into two categories: directly possessed nouns and indirectly possessed nouns.

Directly possessed nouns
The following generalizations can be given on the subject of these types of nouns:
 most external body parts
 many internal organs, though some do not fall under this category
 some bodily products (saliva), though many do not fall under this category
 many body parts and products associated with these animals
 some kin terms (son/daughter)
 many parts of trees and plants

References
Crowley, Terry (2006). The Avava language of central Malakula (Vanuatu). Canberra:  Research School of Pacific and Asian Studies, The Australian National University.

External links 
 PARADISEC open-access archive of Avava language recordings

Malekula languages
Languages of Vanuatu